Mattheos may refer to:

 Abuna Mattheos X (1843–1926), Ethiopian priest
 Mattheos Maroukakis (born 1990), Greek football player